The Final Chapter may refer to:
The Final Chapter (Hypocrisy album), 1997
The Final Chapter (C-Bo album)
The Final Chapter (Ruff Endz album)
The Final Chapter (Dungeon album)
All Areas – Worldwide, a 1997 live album by Accept, released as The Final Chapter in Japan and the United States
Urusei Yatsura: The Final Chapter, the fifth movie of Urusei Yatsura
"The Gathering of Five and The Final Chapter", a Spider-Man story-line
Friday the 13th: The Final Chapter, the fourth Friday the 13th film, released in 1984
Puppet Master 5: The Final Chapter, the fifth Puppet Master film, released in 1994
Lake Placid: The Final Chapter, the fourth Lake Placid film, released in 2012
Duets: The Final Chapter, third posthumous album by The Notorious B.I.G., released in 2005
The Final Chapter, a 1988 anime film based on the Maison Ikkoku manga series
 Saw 3D: The Final Chapter, the seventh film in the Saw franchise, released in 2010.
 Resident Evil: The Final Chapter, the sixth film in the Resident Evil film series, released in 2017.